Arthur Tutin (3 April 1907 – 1961) was an English footballer who played in the Football League for Aldershot and Stoke City.

Career
Tutin was born in Coundon and played for a good number of local non-league teams and after failed trials at Sheffield Wednesday and Bradford Park Avenue he joined Aldershot in 1932. After playing 12 matches for the "Shots" Tutin joined First Division Stoke City for £500. Standing at just 5 ft 4in he looked well out of place in Stoke's squad and he made a nightmare start. Tasked with marking Middlesbrough's Charlie Ferguson on his debut, Tutin left him unmarked twice as Stoke crashed to a 6–1 defeat. However, he soon got to grips with top flight football and his lack of height was his main asset as his job in the side was to win the ball back and play in the wingers Frank Soo and Stanley Matthews and it was a task he excelled at. He became an ever-present in the Stoke side in the mid 30s playing every match during the 1935–36 season as Stoke finished in 4th position their highest up to that point. He remained in Bob McGrory's team for two more seasons before losing his place to Jock Kirton.

Career statistics
Source:

References

1907 births
1961 deaths
English footballers
Association football wing halves
Shildon A.F.C. players
Newton Aycliffe F.C. players
Ferryhill Athletic F.C. players
Bishop Auckland F.C. players
Consett A.F.C. players
Chilton Colliery Recreation F.C. players
Spennymoor United F.C. players
Crook Town A.F.C. players
Aldershot F.C. players
Stoke City F.C. players
English Football League players
People from Coundon
Footballers from County Durham